Calgary-Millican was a provincial electoral district in Calgary, Alberta, Canada, mandated to return a single member to the Legislative Assembly of Alberta using the first past the post method of voting from 1971 to 1993.

History
The Calgary-Millican electoral district was created in the 1970 electoral boundary re-distribution from part of the Calgary-East and Calgary South electoral districts.

The Calgary-Millican electoral district was abolished in the 1993 electoral boundary re-distribution, where the district was split, with the south part of the riding joined Calgary Shaw and the north merged with Calgary-Forest Lawn to re-form Calgary East electoral district.

It was named after the neighbourhood of Millican, in the Ogden community.

Historically this riding covered much of the same boundaries when it was split in 1989 as Calgary-Fort.

Members of the Legislative Assembly (MLAs)

Election results

1971 general election

1975 general election

1979 general election

1982 general election

1986 general election

1989 general election

See also
List of Alberta provincial electoral districts
Ogden, Calgary, a community in Calgary which includes the neighbourhoods of Lynnwood and Millican Estates

References

Further reading

External links
Elections Alberta
The Legislative Assembly of Alberta

Former provincial electoral districts of Alberta
Politics of Calgary